The Men's Giant Slalom in the 2017 FIS Alpine Skiing World Cup involved nine events, including the second-ever parallel giant slalom (again in Alta Badia) and the season finals in Aspen, Colorado (USA). Marcel Hirscher of Austria won four of the races this season and finished second in four others, easily winning the discipline for the third straight season on his way to his sixth straight overall World Cup championship.  Hirscher was so dominant during the season (winning the discipline by almost 300 points) that much of the focus in the news coverage by the end of the season was about his desire to continue, considering the pressure on him to win (especially in his native Austria). 

The season was interrupted by the 2017 World Ski Championships, which were held from 6–20 February in St. Moritz, Switzerland. The men's giant slalom was held on 17 February.

Standings 
 

DNS = Did Not Start
DNF1 = Did Not Finish run 1
DSQ1 = Disqualified run 1
DNQ = Did Not Qualify for run 2
DNF2 = Did Not Finish run 2
DSQ2 = Disqualified run 2

Updated at 19 March 2017 after all events.

See also
 2017 Alpine Skiing World Cup – Men's summary rankings
 2017 Alpine Skiing World Cup – Men's Overall
 2017 Alpine Skiing World Cup – Men's Downhill
 2017 Alpine Skiing World Cup – Men's Super-G
 2017 Alpine Skiing World Cup – Men's Slalom
 2017 Alpine Skiing World Cup – Men's Combined

References

External links
 Alpine Skiing at FIS website

Men's Giant Slalom
FIS Alpine Ski World Cup men's giant slalom discipline titles